Myxodagnus is a genus of sand stargazers, native to the Pacific and Atlantic coastal waters of the Americas.

Species
There are currently five recognized species in this genus:
 Myxodagnus belone J. E. Böhlke, 1968 (Dartfish)
 Myxodagnus macrognathus Hildebrand, 1946
 Myxodagnus opercularis T. N. Gill, 1861 (Dart stargazer)
 Myxodagnus sagitta G. S. Myers & Wade, 1946
 Myxodagnus walkeri C. E. Dawson, 1976

References

 
Dactyloscopidae
Marine fish genera
Taxa named by Theodore Gill